Harry J. Palmer (February 28, 1872 – February 12, 1948) was an American politician from New York.

Life
He was born on February 28, 1872, in Dover, Morris County, New Jersey, the son of Charles E. Palmer and Anne (Cowley) Palmer. His father died in 1878, and he and his mother moved to Philadelphia, Pennsylvania, in 1880. There he attended the public schools, and then began to work at a department store.

He moved to Port Richmond, Staten Island.

Palmer was a member of the New York State Senate (24th D.) from 1929 to 1934, sitting in the 152nd, 153rd, 154th, 155th, 156th and 157th New York State Legislatures; and was Chairman of the Committee on Internal Affairs of Towns, Counties and Public Highways from 1933 to 1934.

He died on February 12, 1948.

Sources

1872 births
1948 deaths
Democratic Party New York (state) state senators
People from Dover, New Jersey
Politicians from Philadelphia
Politicians from Staten Island